Madhwapur refers to both a block in the Madhubani district in State of Bihar, India, and also to a village within that block. Madhwapur is a small block with population of 113,459.

Demographics 
As of 2011, the village of Madhwapur contains 1362 families and has a total population of 6739, of which 3529 are male while 3210 are female.

The sex ratio of Madhwapur village is 910 females to 1000 males on average. Among children, this ratio is on average 878 females to every 1000 males.

In 2011, the literacy rate of Madhwapur village was 65.54%, with literacy among males at 77.11% and 52.92% among females.

References

Madhubani district